Dave's Picks Volume 21 is a three-CD live album by the rock group the Grateful Dead.  It contains the complete concert recorded on April 2, 1973, at Boston Garden in Boston, Massachusetts.  It was produced as a limited edition of 16,500 copies, and was released on February 1, 2017.

Critical reception 
On AllMusic, Timothy Monger said, "The last show of their winter/spring tour, Vol. 21 finds the Dead stretching out over two very long sets which, in spite of their length, do not contain either of their major gig-stretchers of the era. In place of "Dark Star" or "The Other One", fans were treated to a whopping 34-song marathon...  Several nice long jams can be found, particularly in the second set, making for a diverse and engaging listen."

Track listing 
Disc 1
First set:
"Promised Land" (Chuck Berry) – 3:38
"Deal" (Jerry Garcia, Robert Hunter) – 4:43
"Mexicali Blues" (Bob Weir, John Perry Barlow) – 3:42
"Brown-Eyed Women" (Garcia, Hunter) – 5:47
"Beat It On Down the Line" (Jesse Fuller)  – 3:37 
"Row Jimmy" (Garcia, Hunter) – 8:25
"Looks Like Rain" (Weir, Barlow) – 7:51
"Wave That Flag" (Garcia, Hunter) – 5:49
"Box of Rain" (Phil Lesh, Hunter) – 5:19
"Big River" (Johnny Cash) – 4:37
"China Cat Sunflower" > (Garcia, Hunter) – 7:13
"I Know You Rider" (traditional, arranged by Grateful Dead) – 5:45
"You Ain't Woman Enough" (Loretta Lynn) – 3:13
"Jack Straw" (Weir, Hunter) – 4:46
Disc 2
"Don't Ease Me In" (traditional, arranged by Grateful Dead) – 4:06
"Playing in the Band" (Weir, Mickey Hart, Hunter) – 17:31
Second set:
"Ramble On Rose" (Garcia, Hunter) – 6:39
"Me and My Uncle" (John Phillips) – 3:23
"Mississippi Half-Step Uptown Toodeloo" (Garcia, Hunter) – 7:12
"Greatest Story Ever Told" (Weir, Hart, Hunter) – 5:25
"Loose Lucy" (Garcia, Hunter) – 7:07
"El Paso" (Marty Robbins) – 4:29
"Stella Blue" (Garcia, Hunter) – 7:48
"Around and Around" (Berry) – 4:42
Disc 3
"Here Comes Sunshine" > (Garcia, Hunter) – 9:20
"Jam" > (Grateful Dead) – 11:08
"Me and Bobby McGee" > (Kris Kristofferson, Fred Foster)– 6:07
"Weather Report Suite: Prelude" > (Weir) – 3:12
"Eyes of the World" > (Garcia, Hunter) – 15:58
"China Doll" (Garcia, Hunter) – 6:12
"Sugar Magnolia" (Weir, Hunter) – 8:59
"Casey Jones" (Garcia, Hunter) – 7:26
Encore:
"Johnny B. Goode" > (Berry) – 3:38
"And We Bid You Goodnight" (traditional, arranged by Grateful Dead) – 2:12
Notes

Personnel
Grateful Dead
Jerry Garcia – guitar, vocals
Donna Jean Godchaux – vocals
Keith Godchaux – keyboards
Bill Kreutzmann – drums
Phil Lesh – bass, vocals
Bob Weir – guitar, vocals
Production
Produced by Grateful Dead
Produced for release by David Lemieux
Mastering: Jeffrey Norman
Recording: Rex Jackson
Art direction, design: Steve Vance
Cover art: Dave Van Patten
Photos: Patty Norman, Rich "The Fish" Weiner
Liner Notes: David Lemieux
Executive producer: Mark Pinkus
Associate producers: Doran Tyson, Ivette Ramos
Tape research: Michael Wesley Johnson

Charts

References 

21
2017 live albums
Rhino Records live albums